Syritta albopilosa is a species of syrphid fly in the family Syrphidae.

Distribution
Tanzania.

References

Eristalinae
Diptera of Africa
Insects described in 2005